The Nutty Professor is a 1996 American science fiction comedy film starring Eddie Murphy. It is a remake of the 1963 film of the same name, which starred Jerry Lewis, which itself was a parody of Robert Louis Stevenson's 1886 novella Strange Case of Dr Jekyll and Mr Hyde. The film co-stars Jada Pinkett, James Coburn, Larry Miller, Dave Chappelle, and John Ales.

Filming began on 8 May 1995 and concluded on 8 September 1995. The original music score was composed by David Newman. The film won Best Makeup at the 69th Academy Awards.

Murphy portrays a university professor, Sherman Klump, a brainy and kind-hearted man who is morbidly obese. A research scientist, academic, and lecturer, Klump develops a miraculous, but experimental, weight-loss pharmaceutical, and hoping to win the affection of the girl of his dreams, tests it upon himself. Just like Julius Kelp from the original film, Klump's vigorous, charismatic, but evil alter ego takes the name "Buddy Love". Murphy plays a total of seven characters in the film, including Sherman and most of Sherman's family, consisting of Sherman's older brother, Sherman's maternal grandmother, and both of Sherman's parents. Sherman's nephew is the only member of the family not to be portrayed by Eddie Murphy.

The film received positive reviews, with critics particularly praising the makeup and Murphy's performance. The film's success spawned a sequel, Nutty Professor II: The Klumps, released in 2000.

Plot

Sherman Klump, a morbidly obese and kind-hearted professor at Wellman College, creates an experimental formula that reconstructs someone's DNA for weight to be lost easier. Sherman, during a date at a club, called The Scream, with Carla Purty, a chemistry graduate who is a big fan of his work, is made fun of for his weight by insult comic, Reggie Warrington. This influences him to test his serum on himself the next morning, losing 250 pounds within seconds. He initially celebrates the weight loss, but later finds the effects of the serum are only temporary. Sherman adopts a false identity, "Buddy Love", and invites Carla out on a date at The Scream again. Reggie is present again, and Buddy takes revenge for Sherman by heckling him mercilessly, topping it off with a sardonic interpretation of Minnie Riperton’s “Lovin’ You” on a piano. Sherman's "Buddy" persona starts to develop an independent personality due to the heightened testosterone levels of the transformation, gradually changing from his regular good-natured self to perverted and super-confident. This transformation is seen by Sherman's lab assistant, Jason.

Buddy's identity also takes over Sherman's job and all the credit for his work. He meets Dean Richmond and wealthy businessman, Harlan Hartley, the latter planning to donate $10 million to the science department. Buddy shows the serum, which impresses Hartley and Dean Richmond to the point where they invite him to the Alumni Ball the next night. Buddy then cheats on Carla with three women, and Carla dumps him out of disgust. After being fired as a professor, Sherman attempts to stop the alter ego by destroying all of the serum samples, which he does with Jason's help. However, Buddy is hiding a sample of the serum in one of Sherman's diet shake cans, which Sherman drinks, causing him to transform into Buddy again. He then punches Jason, knocking him to the floor.

Jason discovers Buddy's testosterone levels are at a lethally high 60,000% and gets to the ball in the middle of Buddy's demonstration of the serum. Buddy plans to drink the serum to get rid of Sherman, resulting in a fight between the two identities. Sherman eventually transforms into his regular self and admits his misdeeds to the shocked audience, including his parents, Cletus and Anna, and Carla. As he leaves, Carla stops him and asks why he lied; he says he did not believe that she would accept him. Carla forgives Sherman and invites him to dance with her. Jason presents Sherman with a tuxedo that will fit him. Richmond rehires Sherman and Hartley donates the grant to Wellman because he remarks that Sherman is "a brilliant scientist and a gentleman as well". Sherman and Carla continue to dance at the center with Sherman's mother cheering them on.

Cast
 Eddie Murphy as Professor Sherman Klump / Buddy Love
 Murphy also plays Papa Cletus Klump (Sherman's father), Mama Anna Klump (Sherman's mother), Grandma Ida Mae Jenson (Sherman's grandmother, Anna's mother), Ernie Klump Sr. (Sherman's brother) and Lance Perkins, a parody of Richard Simmons
 Jada Pinkett as Carla Purty
 James Coburn as Harlan Hartley
 Larry Miller as Dean Richmond
 Dave Chappelle as Reggie Warrington
 Chappelle reprised his role on Chris Rock's 1997 album Roll with the New.
 John Ales as Jason
 Jamal Mixon as Ernie Klump Jr., Sherman's nephew. Ernie Jr. is the only member of the Klump family with a different actor.
 Montell Jordan as Montell
 Ned Luke as a construction worker

Production
Producer Brian Grazer pursued the idea of remaking The Nutty Professor with a black lead after it was suggested to him by music producer Russell Simmons. Murphy and Grazer had hoped John Landis would direct, having previously worked successfully with Murphy. Ultimately Tom Shadyac, director of Ace Ventura: Pet Detective, joined the project. The Nutty Professor was the first Tom Shadyac film to feature outtakes over the closing credits. 

Murphy, Barry Blaustein and David Sheffield worked together on the screenplay. The film is not a strict remake of the Jerry Lewis film; Murphy said, "we stripped down the story to its bare bones and built it up to this whole different thing", adding elements from the story of Jekyll and Hyde as well as Cyrano de Bergerac.

The film has a series of scenes with Murphy and comedian Dave Chappelle who plays insult comic Reggie Warrington. Much of their dialogue was improvised. Murphy was one of Chappelle's biggest comedic influences. Reggie Warrington is named after Reginald and Warrington Hudlin, brothers, and directors of one of Murphy's previous films, Boomerang. Reginald Hudlin was stunned to see the obnoxious character was named after him and his brother, and to see the character violently stuffed into a piano.

The film was made with the help of Jerry Lewis. He was an executive producer for both this film and the 2000 sequel The Klumps. In 2009 he expressed regret for allowing the remakes saying, "I have such respect for Eddie, but I should not have done it. What I did was perfect the first time around and all you're going to do is diminish that perfection by letting someone else do it."

Rick Baker created the fat suits for Murphy. They were made from urethane foam and a spandex suit, and filled with pockets of liquid to make it jiggle believably. It took three hours to apply the makeup each day. Baker praised Murphy saying "He really makes the stuff come to life, and he never complains. When we did The Nutty Professor [...], he spent 80-odd days in the makeup chair. As much as I love makeup, even I would have been complaining by the end, but Eddie didn't."

Music

Reception

Box office
The Nutty Professor was a box office success, opening with $25,411,725 and reaching a domestic sum of $128,814,019, and $145,147,000 internationally, for a total of $273,961,019 worldwide.

Critical response
The Nutty Professor has received generally positive reviews from critics. Rotten Tomatoes gave the film a score of 64% based on reviews from 55 critics, with an average rating of 5.90/10. The site's consensus states: "The Nutty Professor falls back on juvenile humor eagerly and often, but Eddie Murphy's consistently funny work in dual roles means more for audiences to love." Metacritic gave the film a score of 62 out of 100, based on reviews from 20 critics, indicating "generally favorable reviews". Audiences surveyed by CinemaScore gave the film a grade A− on scale of A to F.

Roger Ebert of the Chicago Sun-Times gave the film 3 stars out of 4, calling it "a movie that's like a thumb to the nose for everyone who said [Murphy had] lost it. He's very good. And the movie succeeds in two different ways: it's sweet and good-hearted, and then again it's raucous slapstick and bathroom humor. I liked both parts." Owen Gleiberman of Entertainment Weekly gave the film a B+, writing "You can feel Murphy rediscovering his joy as a performer. He rediscovers it, too, as Sherman Klump, a fellow who, much like Murphy, is on the bottom rung, desperate to reinvent himself, and — at long last — does." Peter Travers of Rolling Stone gave the film a positive review, saying "Eddie Murphy is funny again. Sadly, he lacks the guts to follow through on the cathartic self-satire that gives the film its distinction." Travers praised the amazing fat makeup by Rick Baker, but criticizes the easy fat jokes, and concludes "Only when Murphy stops skewering the compulsive overeater in his nutty professor and targets the sexist pig does the film hit home."

Accolades
 
 69th Academy Awards
 Best Makeup (Won)
 54th Golden Globe Awards
 Best Actor in a Musical/Comedy - Eddie Murphy (Nominated)

Sequel 

A sequel, Nutty Professor II: The Klumps was released on July 28, 2000.

See also

 Eddie Murphy filmography
 Dr. Dolittle
 The Nutty Professor (film series)
Flubber, a remake of The Absent-minded Professor and starring Robin Williams

References

External links

 
 
 
 

1996 films
1996 romantic comedy films
1990s science fiction comedy films
1990s screwball comedy films
African-American films
African-American comedy films
Remakes of American films
American science fiction comedy films
American romantic comedy films
American screwball comedy films
BAFTA winners (films)
Dr. Jekyll and Mr. Hyde films
1990s English-language films
Films about educators
Films about scientists
Films directed by Tom Shadyac
Films produced by Brian Grazer
Films set in California
Films set in Los Angeles
Films set in universities and colleges
Films that won the Academy Award for Best Makeup
Imagine Entertainment films
The Nutty Professor
Universal Pictures films
Films scored by David Newman
Films with screenplays by Steve Oedekerk
Films with screenplays by Tom Shadyac
Films with screenplays by Barry W. Blaustein
Films with screenplays by David Sheffield
1990s American films